Mann may refer to:

Arts, entertainment and media 

 Mann (chess), a variant chess piece which moves as a king
 Mann (film), a 1999 Bollywood motion picture
 Mann (magazine), a Norwegian magazine
 Mann Theatres, a theatre chain corporation
 Mann Co., a fictional company in Team Fortress 2
 Mann Manor, a map for Team Fortress 2

Language 
 Mann language, spoken in Guinea and Liberia
 Mannaz (ᛗ), a runic letter of the Germanic Elder Futhark

People 
 Mann (rapper) (born 1991), from California, US
 Mann (surname), people with the surname Mann
 Thomas Mann, a German novelist, essayist and Nobel Prize laureate (1875–1955)
 Horace Mann, a America public school advocator and senator (1796-1859)

Places 
 Isle of Man (also Mann), an island nation in the Irish Sea
 Mann Island, Liverpool, England
 Mann Auditorium, the Heichal HaTarbut concert hall in Tel Aviv, Israel (former name)

Other uses 
 Mann (paramilitary rank), a Nazi rank
 Mann (unit), an Arabic unit of mass
 Maund, an obsolete unit of mass used in South Asia

See also
 Maan (disambiguation)
 Man (disambiguation)